Parliamentary elections were held in Iran on 20 June 1975. All 268 seats were won by the new monarchist party, the Rastakhiz Party. Voter turnout was 48.6%, although according to official reports, for both houses, out of an electorate of 14 million, 70 percent (9.8 million) registered to
vote and 52 percent of the electorate (about 7 million) cast its vote.

This was the final election held under the rule of the Shah of Iran before the Iranian Revolution of 1979.

Campaign
Around 750 candidates contested the elections, of which 80% were standing for the first time. All candidates had to adhere to three basic principles: "faith in Iran's constitution, loyalty to the monarchical regime, and fidelity to the 'white revolution'." Mainly the rules were to follow a set of non-exploitation laws.

However, the Rastakhiz Party, like others before it, lacked a popular base. Even though the candidates adhered to the philosophy of the rule by the monarchy, there were sometimes three or four candidates for the same seats as the party slated several candidates for the seats. However, Communists were banned from running for office.

Electoral system 
Members of the Majlis were elected using the multiple non-transferable vote system. Tehran was allocated twenty-seven seats, Tabriz nine, Shiraz seven, Isfahan five and Ahwaz, Abadan, Babol, Rasht, Rezaieh, Karaj, and Kermanshah three. Of the remaining seats, twenty-five were allocated in two-member districts, and 139 in single-member districts.

Results

Majlis

Senate

References

1975 elections in Iran
1975 elections in Asia
One-party elections
Iranian Senate elections
National Consultative Assembly elections
Lower house elections in Iran